Pringle is a Scottish surname.

Notable people with the surname include:

 Aileen Pringle (1895–1989), American stage and film actress
 Alan Pringle (born 1952), American football player
 Alexander Pringle (politician) (1791–1857), Scottish Conservative politician
 Alexandra Pringle (born 1952/1953), British publisher
 Andrew Pringle:
 Andrew Pringle (British Army officer) (born 1946), British Army officer
 Andrew Pringle, Lord Alemoor (died 1776), Scottish judge
 Andrew Seth Pringle-Pattison (1856–1931), Scottish philosopher
 Andy Pringle (born ), Canadian bond trader and Conservative political activist in Ontario
 Anne Pringle (born 1955), British diplomat
 Benjamin Pringle (1807–1887), American politician
 Bryan Pringle (1935–2002), British actor
 Byron Pringle (born 1993), American football player
 Cedric E. Pringle (born c. 1964), United States Navy admiral
 Charlie Pringle (born 1894), Scottish footballer
 Chris Pringle (born 1968), New Zealand cricketer
 Christine Pringle, Australian pastor
 Cyrus Pringle (1838–1911), American botanist
 Curt Pringle (born 1959), California politician
 David Pringle (born 1950), Scottish science fiction editor
 Denys Pringle (born 1951), British archaeologist and medievalist
 Derek Pringle (born 1958), English cricketer
 Donald Pringle (1932–1975), English cricketer
 Eric Pringle, (1935-2017), British television and radio writer
 Eunice Pringle (1912–1996), American actress
 Harold Pringle (d. 1945), executed Canadian soldier
 Harry Pringle (190065), English footballer 
 Harry Pringle (producer) (1903after 1959), radio and television producer who worked on light entertainment programmes in England and Australia
 Heather Pringle (writer), Canadian author and journalist
 Henry F. Pringle, (1897–1958) American historian; Pulitzer prize 
 James Pringle:
 James Alexander Pringle (1874–1935), British politician
 James E. Pringle (born 1949), British astrophysicist
 James Hogarth Pringle (1863–1941), Australian surgeon
 Jen Pringle (born 1983) English TV children's presenter and actress
 Joan Pringle (born 1945), American actress
 Joel R. P. Pringle (1873–1932), US naval officer
 John Pringle:
 John Pringle (1707–1782), Scottish physician
 John Pringle (born 1938), Australian baritone
 John Pringle, Lord Haining (–1754), Scottish landowner, judge and politician, shire commissioner for Selkirk 1702–07, MP for Selkirkshire 1708–29, Lord of Session
 John Pringle (MP, born 1716) (–1792), son of the above, Scottish landowner and politician, MP for Selkirkshire 1765–86
 John Pringle (1796–1831) of Haining, Scottish politician, MP for Lanark Burghs 1819–20
 John James Pringle (1855–1922), British dermatologist
 John Abbott Pringle, Ontario farmer, merchant and political figure
 John Quinton Pringle (1864–1925), Scottish painter
 John Wallace Pringle (1863–1938), Chief Inspecting Officer of the UK Railways Inspectorate
 John William Sutton Pringle (1912–1982), British zoologist
 Sir John Pringle, 2nd Baronet (1662–1721) of the Pringle Baronets
 Sir John Pringle, 5th Baronet (1784–1869) of the Pringle Baronets
 Mark Pringle, member of Hot House
 Martin Pringle (born 1964), New Zealand cricketer
 Martin Pringle (born 1970), Swedish soccer player
 Mike Pringle:
 Mike Pringle (politician) (born 1945), Scottish Member of Parliament
 Mike Pringle (gridiron football) (born 1967), Canadian football player
 Meyrick Pringle (born 1966), South African cricketer
 Percy Pringle (1954–2013), American wrestling manager (better known by another ring name, Paul Bearer)
 Phil Pringle (born 1952), Australian pastor
 Ramona Pringle, Canadian actress
 Richard Pringle, American psychologist and professor
 Robert Pringle:
 Robert Pringle (politician) (d. 1736), British politician
 Robert Abercrombie Pringle (1855–1922), Canadian lawyer and politician
 Robert Pringle (poet) (born 1940), American poet
 Thomas Pringle:
 Thomas Pringle (1789–1834), Scottish writer, poet and abolitionist
 Thomas Pringle (politician) (born 1967), Irish politician
 Thomas Pringle (Royal Navy officer) (d. 1803), admiral in the Royal Navy
 Valerie Pringle (born 1953), Canadian journalist and television host
 Walter Pringle, Lord Newhall (1664?–1736), Scottish lawyer and judge
 Walter Pringle (rugby union) (1869–1945), New Zealand rugby union player
 William Pringle:
 William Henry Pringle (1772–1840), British soldier and Member of Parliament
 William Henderson Pringle (1877-1967), Scottish politician
 William Pringle (Liberal politician) (1874-1928), British Member of Parliament

See also
Clan Pringle

References

Surnames of Lowland Scottish origin